The  is an association of journalists in Japan.

History
This was established as a national press centre, in place of Foreign Correspondents' Club of Japan, in November 1969.

See also 
 Press club
 Mass media and politics in Japan
 Kisha club

External links
Japan National Press Club

Press clubs
Japanese journalism organizations
1969 establishments in Japan
Organizations established in 1969